M. dentata may refer to:
 Mastigoteuthis dentata, a squid species
 Melitara dentata, the North American cactus moth, a moth species native to western North America

See also
 Dentata (disambiguation)